Verdena is the first released demotape by the Italian alternative-rock band Verdena, recorded in 1997.

Track list

 Fuxia 
 Fiato Adolescenziale 
 Nella Schiuma
 Zoe
 Bambina In Nero
 Mormorio Mucoso
 Memo box
 Sara
 Bevimi
 Blu Ninive
 Omnia 2241

References

1997 albums
Demo albums
Verdena albums